Joaquim Pedro de Andrade (May 25, 1932 – September 10, 1988) was a Brazilian film director and screenwriter.  He was a member of the Cinema Novo movement in Brazil.  Andrade is best known for his 1969 film Macunaíma, based loosely on the novel of the same title by Mário de Andrade. His 1962 documentary film Garrincha: Hero of the Jungle was entered into the 13th Berlin International Film Festival.

Filmography

References

Bibliography 

 Patrice Kirchhofer, « Film saboté de Pedro De Andrade » (2001) in Nicole Brenez, Christian Lebrat (codir.), Jeune, dure et pure ! Une histoire du cinéma d’avant-garde et expérimental en France, Paris/Milan, Cinémathèque française/Mazzotta, 2001, p. 269 (ISBN 2-900596-30-0)

External links

1932 births
1988 deaths
Brazilian male writers
Brazilian film directors